Dominik Franke (born 5 October 1998) is a German professional footballer who plays as a left-back for FC Ingolstadt 04.

Career
Franke made his professional debut for Wehen Wiesbaden in the 2. Bundesliga on 4 August 2019, coming on as a substitute in the 33rd minute for Michel Niemeyer in the 3–2 away loss against Erzgebirge Aue.

References

External links
 
 
 Profile at DFB.de
 Profile at kicker.de

1998 births
Living people
People from Riesa
Footballers from Saxony
German footballers
Germany youth international footballers
Association football fullbacks
RB Leipzig II players
RB Leipzig players
VfL Wolfsburg II players
VfL Wolfsburg players
SV Wehen Wiesbaden players
FC Ingolstadt 04 players
2. Bundesliga players
3. Liga players
Regionalliga players